Üçgül is a village in the Genç District, Bingöl Province, Turkey. The village is populated by Kurds and had a population of 118 in 2021.

The hamlets of Arıtaş, Boğaziçi, Büyükköy, Çobankaya, Gelincik, Göçebağ, İbrahimler and Sancaklı are attached to the village.

References 

Villages in Genç District
Kurdish settlements in Bingöl Province